Oxana Kozonchuk (born 28 May 1988) is a Russian former professional racing cyclist.

Major results

2008
 3rd  Team pursuit, UEC European Under-23 Track Championships (with Maria Mishina, Evgenia Romanyuta and Victoria Kondel)
 7th Road race, UEC European Under-23 Road Championships
 7th GP de Plouay – Bretagne
 9th Drentse 8 van Dwingeloo
2010
 UEC European Under-23 Road Championships
6th Road race
10th Time trial
 9th GP Ciudad de Valladolid
 10th Overall Iurreta-Emakumeen Bira
2012
 2nd Grand Prix of Maykop
 6th Memorial Davide Fardelli
 7th GP Liberazione
2013
 2nd Road race, National Road Championships
 4th Overall Tour de Bretagne Féminin
1st Points classification
1st Stage 1
 4th Overall Tour Féminin en Limousin
1st Stage 1
 6th Overall Tour of Zhoushan Island
 6th EPZ Omloop van Borsele
 Tour of Chongming Island
7th Overall Stage race
9th World Cup
 10th Chrono Champenois
2015
 6th Grand Prix of Maykop
 9th Overall Tour of Zhoushan Island
2016
 3rd Road race, National Road Championships

References

External links

1988 births
Living people
Russian female cyclists
Place of birth missing (living people)
Cyclists at the 2015 European Games
European Games competitors for Russia
21st-century Russian women